Complement C1q tumor necrosis factor-related protein 3 is a protein that in humans is encoded by the C1QTNF3 gene.

References

External links

Further reading